The 1937–38 NCAA men's basketball season began in December 1937, progressed through the regular season and conference tournaments, and concluded in March 1938.

Rule changes 
After a field goal, the opposing team receives possession of the ball. Previously, a jump ball at center court had taken place after every field goal.

Season headlines 

 The New England Conference played its first season at the major-program level.
 The Northern California Conference began play.
 The Metropolitan Basketball Writers Association founded the National Invitation Tournament (NIT), which was played for the first time in 1938. A field of six teams participated, with the Temple Owls winning the first NIT championship. Although the NCAA tournament began play the following season, the NIT, playing its games at Madison Square Garden and easily accessible to the New York City media, was considered the more glamorous and prestigious of the two tournaments until at least the mid-1950s 
 In February 1943, the Helms Athletic Foundation retroactively selected Temple as its national champion for the 1937–38 season.
 In 1995, the Premo-Porretta Power Poll retroactively selected Temple as its national champion for the 1937–38 season.

Conference membership changes

Regular season

Conference winners and tournaments

Statistical leaders

Post-Season Tournaments

National Invitation Tournament

Semifinals & finals 

 Third Place – Oklahoma A&M 37, NYU 24

Awards

Consensus All-American team

Major player of the year awards 

 Helms Player of the Year: Hank Luisetti, Stanford (retroactive selection  in 1944)

Other major awards 

 NIT/Haggerty Award (Top player in New York City metro area): Bernie Fliegel, CCNY

Coaching changes 

A number of teams changed coaches during the season and after it ended.

References